The Brit Award for British Alternative/Rock Act (previously known as the Brit Award for British Rock Act) is an award given by the British Phonographic Industry (BPI), an organisation which represents record companies and artists in the United Kingdom. The accolade was presented at the Brit Awards, an annual celebration of British and international music. The winners and nominees were determined by the Brit Awards voting academy with over one-thousand members comprising record labels, publishers, managers, agents, media, and previous winners and nominees.

The inaugural recipients of the award are The Darkness, who won in 2004. The category only featured bands as nominees until it was revived in 2022. Muse, Kasabian and Tom Grennan hold the record for most nominations without a win, with two. Sam Fender is the first solo artist to win the category. The award is currently held by The 1975 since 2023.

History
The Brit Award for British Rock Act was first presented at the 2004 Brit Awards and last presented in 2006. 

In 2021, it was announced that the category had been revived and renamed British Rock/Alternative Act following the removal of gendered categories. This new iteration of the award was first presented at the 42nd Brit Awards and is voted for by the public on TikTok alongside the three other genre categories (Pop/R&B Act, Dance Act and Hip Hop/Grime/Rap Act).

Winners and nominees

British Rock Act (2004–2006)

British Rock/Alternative Act (2022–present)

Multiple nominations and awards

References

Brit Awards
Rock music awards
Awards established in 2004